Kshamichu Ennoru Vaakku is a 1986 Indian Malayalam film, directed by Joshiy. The film stars Geetha, Mammootty, Mukesh and Shobhana in the lead roles. The film has musical score by Shyam. The movie did above average business in box office

Cast 
 Mammootty	as Adv. Ravindranath 
 Geetha as Sreedevi, Satheesh's lover
 Shobana as Indu, Ravindranath's wife
 Mukesh as Satheesh
 K.P.A.C. Sunny as Veera Raghava Menon
 Kaviyoor Ponnamma	as Shanthamma
 Master Prasobh as Sreedevi's Son
 Srividya as Sasikala
 Urvashi as Rajani (Cameo Appearance)
 Jagathy Sreekumar as Watch Paramu
 Mala Aravindan as Panikkar
 Jose Prakash as Judge
 Kanakalatha as Police Constable

Soundtrack
The music was composed by Shyam and the lyrics were written by Poovachal Khader.

References

External links 
 

1980s Malayalam-language films
1986 films
Films directed by Joshiy